The 2015–16 Northern Iowa Panthers men's basketball team represented the University of Northern Iowa during the 2015–16 NCAA Division I men's basketball season. The Panthers, led by tenth year head coach Ben Jacobson, played their home games at the McLeod Center and were members of the Missouri Valley Conference (The Valley). They finished the 23–13, 11–7 in Missouri Valley play to finish in a tie for fourth place. The Panthers defeated Southern Illinois, Wichita State, and Evansville to win the Missouri Valley tournament and earn the conference's automatic bid to the NCAA tournament. As a No. 11 seed, they defeated Texas in the first round to advance to the second round, where they lost to the Texas A&M Aggies in double overtime after suffering the greatest collapse in NCAA Tournament history, blowing a 12 point lead with 35 seconds left in regulation.

Previous season 

The Panthers finished the 2014–15 season 31–4, 16–2 in MVC play to finish in second place. They defeated Bradley, Loyola–Chicago, and Illinois State to win the Missouri Valley tournament and received the conference's automatic bid to the NCAA tournament. In the Tournament, they defeated Wyoming in the second round before losing in the Third Round to Louisville.

Departures

Incoming Transfers

Incoming recruits

2016 recruiting class

Roster

Schedule

|-
!colspan=9 style=| Exhibition

|-
!colspan=9 style=| Non-conference regular season

|-
!colspan=9 style=| Missouri Valley Conference regular season

|-
! colspan="9" style=|  Missouri Valley tournament

|-
! colspan="9" style=|  NCAA tournament

References

Northern Iowa Panthers men's basketball seasons
Northern Iowa
Northern Iowa
Panth
Panth